Noah Beaumont Mawene (born 1 February 2005) is a English professional footballer who plays as a midfielder for Preston North End.

Career
Mawene is a youth product of Lytham Town FC and joined the youth academy of Preston North End as a U13 where he went on to captain their U18s, and signed his first professional contract with the club on 16 June 2021. He made his professional debut with Preston North End as a late substitute in a 4–1 EFL Championship win over Blackburn Rovers on 10 December 2022.

Personal life
Mawene is the son of the French footballer Youl Mawéné and nephew of Samy Mawéné. He is of Congolese descent through his paternal grandfather, and French descent through his paternal grandmother.

References

External links
 

2005 births
Living people
People from Lytham St Annes
English footballers
English people of Republic of the Congo descent
English people of French descent
Preston North End F.C. players
English Football League players
Association football midfielders